Chaklala Railway Station (Urdu and ) is located in Chaklala town, Rawalpindi district of Punjab province of the Pakistan.

See also
 List of railway stations in Pakistan
 Pakistan Railways

References

External links

Railway stations in Rawalpindi District
Railway stations opened in 1881
Railway stations on Karachi–Peshawar Line (ML 1)